JWed.com is an online dating service aimed at Jewish singles. The website, founded in 2001, followed a predecessor called Dosidate, launched in 1997. Between 2001 and 2012 the site was called Frumster, a play on the term Frum and a joke by Rob Schneider.

In October 2012, Frumster.com changed its name to JWed.com. JWed launched in 2007 as a white-label site, sharing profile listings with Frumster.com until the name was completely changed 2012.

The site attracted criticism in 2004 for refusing profiles from people describing themselves as Conservative Jews. The site is now open to all marriage-minded Jewish singles be they Orthodox observant or halachically Jewish singles.

Membership and marriages 

In December 2005 the site says it had 20,000 members and had facilitated over 500 marriages. JWed CEO Ben Rabizadeh says that of November 2019, the site had facilitated over 3300 marriages.

See also
Shidduch

References

External links
 Frumster website
 Interview with Ben Rabizadeh, Online Personals Watch, August 2008

Online dating for specific interests
Jewish websites
Online dating services of the United States